The Very Idea is an American comedy film directed by Frank Craven and Richard Rosson and written by William Le Baron, based on his play of the same title. Released in 1929, it was the fourth film released by RKO Pictures, starring Sally Blane, Hugh Trevor, Allen Kearns, Doris Eaton and Frank Craven. A comedy based on the theory of eugenics, it was a critical and financial failure.

The play was filmed before in 1920 as a silent starring Taylor Holmes. The 1920 film is lost.

Plot
Alan Camp has written a book on eugenics, and is looking to prove his theories. His sister, Edith Goodhue, and her husband, Gilbert have been frustrated for years with their inability to have children. Alan convinces them to let him create a child through eugenics for them to adopt. Chosen to be the parents of this eugenic child are Joe Garvin, who happens to be Alan's chauffeur, and Nora, the Goodhues' maid. The two are offered $15,000 each if they conceive and deliver a child within twelve months, to which they agree.

To give the young couple room to move ahead with the plan, the Goodhues leave on a year trip to California. Nora and Joe do have the baby, but have fallen in love in the interim and have decided to keep the child. When the Goodhues return from California, they find their home has been converted into a nursery, occupied by Mr. and Mrs. Garvin, who have married. They will not give up their baby, and Alan frantically sends Joe to a local orphanage in order to find a replacement baby. However, the child Joe returns with is rejected by Edith and Gilbert. Despondent, Alan decides to have the nursery dismantled, when Mrs. Goodhue announces that she is pregnant.

Cast
Sally Blane as Nora
Hugh Trevor as Joe Garvin
Allen Kearns as Gilbert Goodhue
Doris Eaton as Edith Goodhue
Frank Craven as Alan Camp
Theodore von Eltz as George Green
Olive Tell as Marion Green
Adele Watson as Miss Duncan

References

External links

RKO Pictures films
1929 comedy films
1929 films
American black-and-white films
Eugenics in fiction
American films based on plays
American comedy films
Films directed by Richard Rosson
1920s American films